John Trimble (February 7, 1812 – February 23, 1884) was an American politician and a member of the United States House of Representatives for Tennessee's 5th congressional district from 1867 to 1869.

Biography
Trimble was born in Roane County, Tennessee son of James and Leticia B. Trimble,  Trimble pursued classical studies under a private tutor and at the University of Nashville. He studied law and was admitted to the bar.

Career
After beginning his practice in Nashville, Tennessee, he became Tennessee Attorney General in 1836, and served until 1842. He served as member of the Tennessee House of Representatives in 1843 and 1844, and in the Tennessee Senate in 1845 and 1846, and in 1859 and 1861. A Southern Unionist, he resigned when the state seceded. He served as a United States Attorney from April 1862 until August 1864, when he resigned. He again served in the state senate from 1865 to 1867.

Elected as a Republican to the Fortieth Congress, he served from March 4, 1867 to March 3, 1869.

Death
Trimble died in Nashville, Tennessee, on February 23, 1884 (age about 72 years). The location at which he is interred is Mount Olivet Cemetery.

References

External links

1812 births
1884 deaths
Tennessee Attorneys General
Republican Party members of the Tennessee House of Representatives
Republican Party Tennessee state senators
Southern Unionists in the American Civil War
People from Roane County, Tennessee
Republican Party members of the United States House of Representatives from Tennessee
19th-century American politicians
United States Attorneys for the Middle District of Tennessee